Phi Pan Nam may refer to:
Phi Pan Nam Range, a mountain range in Thailand 
Doi Phi Pan Nam, a 1,950 m mountain of the Luang Prabang Range located in the Thai-Lao border area
Another name for Phu Khe, a 2, m mountain of the Luang Prabang Range, also located in the Thai-Lao border area